Shooting sports have been included at every Summer Olympic Games since the birth of the modern Olympic movement at the 1896 Summer Olympics except at the 1904 and 1928 games.

Summary

Events
Shooting was one of the nine events at the first modern Olympic Games in Athens, in 1896. Early competitions included some events now regarded as unusual, such as live pigeon shooting in 1900; dueling in 1906 and 1908; and numerous events restricted to military weapons. After the 1900 games, the pigeons were replaced with clay targets. In 1907, the International Shooting Sport Federation came into existence and brought some standardizations to the sport. Shooting events were held in 1908, 1912, 1920 and 1924.

When shooting was reintroduced in 1932, it consisted of two events. From this, the number of events have increased steadily until reaching the 2000–2004 maximum of seventeen events. The 2008 games had only fifteen. Events marked as "Men's" were nominally open events from 1968 until 1980 (and in shotgun events until 1992), although very few women competed in them. For instance, only five women competed at the 1980 Moscow Olympics, while the next Summer Olympics in Los Angeles, which introduced women-only events, featured 77 female competitors. Two women won medals in mixed events: Margaret Murdock, silver in Rifle 3 positions (1976) and Zhang Shan, gold in Skeet (1992).

Events on the current program are listed at the top.

Men's

  Muzzle-loading pistols.
  20 metres, military pistols, professionals.
  30 metres, dueling pistols.
  30 metres, military pistols.
  50 and 100 yards, miniature rifles. 
  50 yards.

Women's

Mixed

Nations

Medal table
Updated after 2020 Olympics

Multi-participation men
Afanasijs Kuzmins with nine participations is the recordman in this special classification.

See also
Biathlon at the Winter Olympics
Military patrol at the Winter Olympics
ISSF World Shooting Championships
List of Olympic venues in shooting
Shooting at the Summer Paralympics

References

External links
 Medals by NOC MEN 1896-2008 WOMEN 1976-2008 (ISSF website)
 ISSF History - International Shooting Sport Federation (ISSF Website)

 
Sports at the Summer Olympics
Olympic Games